The 1932 Eastbourne by-election was a by-election held on 28 April 1932 for the British House of Commons constituency of Eastbourne in East Sussex.

The by-election was caused by the death of the town's Conservative Party Member of Parliament (MP) Edward Marjoribanks, who had held the seat since the 1929 general election.

The Conservative candidate, John Slater, was returned unopposed.

References

See also 
 List of United Kingdom by-elections
 Eastbourne constituency
 1925 Eastbourne by-election
 1935 Eastbourne by-election
 1990 Eastbourne by-election

By-elections to the Parliament of the United Kingdom in East Sussex constituencies
1932 elections in the United Kingdom
1932 in England
20th century in Sussex
Unopposed by-elections to the Parliament of the United Kingdom (need citation)
Politics of Eastbourne